The women's 4 × 5 km relay, a cross-country skiing event at the 1994 Winter Olympics, took place on 22 February at Birkebeineren Ski Stadium in Lillehammer, Norway. The race saw Russia beat Norway by 30.1 seconds, with Italy finishing third.

Results
Sources:

References

Women's cross-country skiing at the 1994 Winter Olympics
Women's 4 × 5 kilometre relay cross-country skiing at the Winter Olympics